The Nyköping Railway Bridge spans the river Nyköpingsån in Nyköping, Sweden.

The original 200 tonne bridge was replaced with a new 320 tonne bridge on 11 August 2008. The new bridge is 51m long, 8m wide and 9m tall.  The former century-old bridge was lifted out using a boom crane and the new bridge was then put into place using the same crane. The process took 10 minutes. With the new bridge, speed on the rail line can be raised from 30 km/h to 130 km/h.

References 

Railway bridges in Sweden